The 2020 Maryland Terrapins football team represented the University of Maryland, College Park in the 2020 NCAA Division I FBS football season. The Terrapins played their home games at Maryland Stadium in College Park, Maryland and competed in the East Division of the Big Ten Conference.

On August 11, 2020, the Big Ten Conference canceled all fall sports competitions due to the COVID-19 pandemic. On September 16, the conference reinstated the football season, announcing a nine-game season beginning on October 23 and 24, 2020. Due to in-season cancellations related to the pandemic, the Terrapins played only five of their scheduled nine games. The Terrapins declined a bowl game invitation, also due to the pandemic.

Offseason

Previous season

The Terrapins finished the 2019 season 3–9, 1–8 in Big Ten play, to finish in sixth place in the East Division.

Spring game

Recruiting

Incoming transfers

Awards and honors

Watch list

Roster

Schedule
Maryland had games scheduled against Towson, Northern Illinois, and West Virginia, but canceled these games on July 9 following the Big Ten Conference's decision to play a 10-game conference-only schedule due to the COVID-19 pandemic. This 10 game, conference-only schedule was later canceled and replaced by a nine-game, conference-only schedule beginning in late October. Teams not selected to participate in the Big Ten Football Championship Game were scheduled to play a ninth consolation game on December 19, seeded by performance in the first eight games.

On November 11, the school announced that the November 14 game against Ohio State had been canceled as all team-related activities were paused because of an elevated number of coronavirus cases within the Terrapins' program. Subsequently, the game against Michigan State was also canceled, then rescheduled in the December 19 consolation game slot, before being canceled again due to further coronavirus cases. On December 2, it was announced that the December 5 game against Michigan had been canceled.

Rankings

Players drafted into the NFL

References

Maryland
Maryland Terrapins football seasons
Maryland Terrapins football